The International Ornithological Committee (IOC) recognizes these 447 species in family Tyrannidae, the tyrant flycatchers; they are distributed among 104 genera. One extinct species, the San Cristobal flycatcher, is included. This list is presented according to the IOC taxonomic sequence and can also be sorted alphabetically by common name and binomial.

List

References

See also

01
Tyrant flycatchers